Togny-aux-Bœufs is a commune in the Marne department in Grand Est, in the north-east of France.

Geography 
The main river feeding the village is the Guenelle. The commune's territory extends from the southwest of the Champagne, north-east to the valley of Marne.

Communes bordering Togny-aux-Bœufs 
 Mairy-sur-Marne
 Vésigneul-sur-Marne
 Pogny
 Coupetz
 Vitry-la-Ville

History 
Togny-aux-Bœufs was founded by a Roman general named Toniacus. His name has evolved over time to Togny-sur-Guenelle, named after the river running along the village, only to take his name as currently known a priori that the cattle used in the construction of the basilica of 'Thorn would have come in pastures of the village to take some rest. The chalk used for construction could come also part of the village.

In 1375, a captain of the King of France, Enguerrand of Coucy, crosses the Champagne road with his band, to the great detriment of the plain "Thus the people of Togny-en-Champagne they saw themselves reduced to crowd into hiding to escape the terrible weapons people. "

Policy and Administration

Cantonal attachment 
During the Revolution, the town joined the canton of Pogny. This was abolished in 1801 and Togny-aux-Bœufs became part of the canton of Écury-sur-Coole. Under the cantonal redistribution in France in 2014, the town became part of the canton of Châlons-en-Champagne-3.

Intercommunality 
The town, previously a member of the Community of communes of Guenelle, is a member, since 1 January 2014, of the communauté de communes de la Moivre à la Coole.

List of mayors

Demographics 
In 2017, the municipality had 137 inhabitants.

Sites and Monuments 
 The Church of St. Brice houses four articles classified historical  monuments: a Madonna and Child of the 13th century, christ on the cross of the 14th century, a bas-relief of the Adoration of the Magi from the 15th century and a stained glass window depicting the Annunciation and two men kneeling alongside a bishop, dating from the 16th century.
 Robinson Chalons, relaxing place;
 by plane, archaeological sites can be identified;
 the town hall ;
 the village cemetery contains many historical elements of interest.

Personalities linked to the commune 
 Togny-aux-Boeufs is the village of origin (from the 17th century) of the Chanoine family: Jean Louis Chanoine (1787-1872), general counsel of the Marne and mayor of Epernay 1840–48; Général Jules Chanoine (1835-1915), general counsel of the Marne and Minister of War in 1898; and champagne house Chanoine Frères

See also 
 Communes of the Marne department

References

Tognyauxboeufs